Meelis Kompus (born December 27, 1980 in Tallinn) is an Estonian civil servant and former Estonian TV and radio host, employed by the Estonian Public Broadcasting.

He has graduated from the Tallinn University in 2003 in radio production (B.A.) and continued in Tartu University, where he received the M.A. in cultural management in 2012.

At the age of 27, he became a news anchor of Aktuaalne kaamera, the evening news programme of Estonian Television, thus being among the youngest ever in that job. He resigned in 2013 to start working in government affairs.

Since 2014, Kompus is serving as the head of communications and spokesperson of the Ministry of Culture of Estonia. He was involved with the 2017 Estonian Youth Song and Dance Festival as a script writer.

References

1980 births
Living people
Estonian journalists
People from Tallinn
Estonian television personalities
Tallinn University alumni
University of Tartu alumni